Joseph-Damase Bégin, also known as Jos-D. Bégin, was a Canadian politician and an eight-term Member of the Legislative Assembly of Quebec.

Background

He was born on August 6, 1900 in Lac-Etchemin, Quebec and was a car dealer.

Member of the legislature

Bégin first won a seat to the Legislative Assembly of Quebec as an Action libérale nationale candidate in 1935 in the district of Dorchester.

His party merged with the Conservative Party of Quebec to form the Union Nationale. Bégin won re-election in 1936, 1939, 1944, 1948, 1952, 1956 and, with a substantially reduced margin, in 1960.

Cabinet Member

From 1940 to 1960, Bégin served as his party's campaign manager.  He was appointed to Premier Maurice Duplessis's Cabinet in 1944.  He did not run for re-election in 1962.

Death

He died on July 4, 1977.

References

1900 births
1977 deaths
Action libérale nationale MNAs
People from Chaudière-Appalaches
Union Nationale (Quebec) MNAs